|}

The Triumph Hurdle is a Grade 1 National Hunt hurdle race in Great Britain which is open to horses aged four years. It is run on the New Course at Cheltenham over a distance of about 2 miles and 1 furlong (2 miles and 179 yards, or 3,382 metres), and during its running there are eight hurdles to be jumped. The race is for juvenile novice hurdlers, and it is scheduled to take place each year during the Cheltenham Festival in March.

It is the leading event in the National Hunt calendar to be exclusively contested by juveniles, and it is the opening race on the final day of the Festival.

History
The event was established in 1939, and it was originally held at Hurst Park in Surrey. During the early part of its history it was regularly contested by horses trained in France – six of the first seven winners were French-based. The flat racing jockey Lester Piggott achieved one of his twenty hurdle victories in this race in 1954.

Hurst Park closed in 1962 and the Triumph Hurdle was not run in 1963 or 1964. The race was transferred to Cheltenham in 1965, and for a period thereafter it was sponsored by the Daily Express. It was initially held during the venue's April meeting, but it became part of the Festival in 1968. The Elite Racing Club took over the sponsorship in 1997, and JCB became the sponsor in 2002.

Winners of the Triumph Hurdle often go on to compete in subsequent editions of the Champion Hurdle. Four horses have achieved victory in both events – Clair Soleil, Persian War, Kribensis and Katchit.

Records
Leading jockey (5 wins):
 Barry Geraghty – Spectroscope (2003), Zaynar (2009), Soldatino (2010), Peace And Co (2015), Ivanovich Gorbatov (2016)

Leading trainer (7 wins):
 Nicky Henderson – First Bout (1985), Alone Success (1987), Katarino (1999), Zaynar (2009), Soldatino (2010), Peace And Co (2015), Pentland Hills (2019)

Winners

See also
 Horse racing in Great Britain
 List of British National Hunt races

References

 Racing Post:

 bbc.co.uk – Hurst Park in Surrey.
 cheltenham.co.uk – Media information pack (2010).
 pedigreequery.com – Triumph Hurdle – Cheltenham.

External links
 Race Recordings 
 Triumph Hurdle – Cheltenham Festival Fans

National Hunt races in Great Britain
Cheltenham Racecourse
National Hunt hurdle races
Recurring sporting events established in 1939
1939 establishments in England